Adventure Island may refer to:

Media
 Adventure Island (film), a 1947 Paramount film starring Rory Calhoun and Rhonda Fleming
 Adventure Island (TV series), an Australian children's television series
 Adventure Island (video game), a 1986 side-scrolling platform game produced by Hudson Soft, beginning the series of the same name
 Adventure Island II, a side-scrolling platformer for Game Boy and sequel to Adventure Island
 Dragon's Curse, a 1989 TurboGrafx-16/PC Engine video game released in Japan as Adventure Island

Places
 Adventure Island (amusement park), a theme park in Southend-on-Sea, UK
 Adventure Island (water park), a theme park in Tampa, Florida, US

See also
 New Adventure Island
 Super Adventure Island
 Adventure Island: The Beginning